The Salzburger Kunstverein is a contemporary art organisation that specialises in art exhibitions. It is located in Salzburg, Austria, and is housed in the Künstlerhaus, built in 1885. The Salzburger Kunstverein organizes between ten and twelve exhibitions of international and Austrian artists annually. The Director since January 2014 is Séamus Kealy.

History 

The Salzburger Kunstverein was founded on March 10, 1844. It was one of the first of such institutions in Austria. According to its founding principles, its aim is "to awaken love for art and educate a sense for art". In 1885 the "Künstlerhaus", which to this day houses studios and exhibition areas, was built and is still the Kunstverein's headquarters today.

Since 2014, Irish-Canadian director, curator and artist Séamus Kealy has been the Director of the Salzburger Kunstverein. Kealy studied at the University of British Columbia and was Director of The Model in Sligo (2008–2013), one of the leading contemporary art institutions in Ireland, as well as the Blackwood Gallery, University of Toronto Mississauga (2005–2008).

In 2008 the Salzburger Kunstverein was awarded the ADKV-ART COLOGNE Price (together with the Westfälischer Kunstverein Münster) for its "excellent exhibition making and art education".

Selected exhibitions 
Source: Salzburger Kunstverein
 1993 Heimo Zobernig
 1995 Marlene Dumas
 1997 Elke Denda / Candida Höfer
 1998 Stan Douglas
 1999 Luc Tuymans
 2000 Monica Bonvicini
 2001 Erwin Wurm
 2002 Elizabeth Peyton
 2004 Cameron Jamie
 2005 Ines Doujak
 2006 Soleil Noir
 2007 Peter Piller
 2008 Gülsün Karamustafa
 2009 Performing the East
 2009 Dan Perjovschi
 2010 Roman Ondák
 2010 Manfred Pernice
 2011 Constantin Luser
 2012 Anna Jermolaewa
 2014 Punctum
 2014 Bedwyr Williams
 2015 Überschönheit
 2015 Paloma Varga Weisz
 2015 Nedko Solakov
 2016 Hans Schabus
 2016 Stan Douglas
 2016 The People's Cinema
 2017 A Painter's Doubt
 2017 Geoffrey Farmer / Gareth Moore
 2018 Ashley Hans Scheirl
 2019 Omer Fast
 2019 Adrian Paci
 2020 Megan Rooney
 2021 Gabriel Abrantes
 2022 Khalil Rabah
 2022 Camille Henrot

Partnerships 
The Salzburger Kunstverein is a member of the ADKV (Arbeitsgemeinschaft Deutscher Kunstvereine) and the Dachverband Salzburger Kulturstätten.

Prizes and awards 
 2008 ADKV-ART COLOGNE prize for Kunstvereine
 2014 "Exhibition of the Year: Punctum", Profil Magazin (Profil 52, print, 22. Dec. 2014)
 2015 Salzburg Culture Poster prize for the exhibition poster Invisible Violence
 2016 "Top Five Exhibitions of the Year: The People's Cinema", Profil Magazin (Profil 52, print, 19. Dec. 2016)
 2017 Salzburg Culture Poster prize for the exhibition poster A Painter's Doubt

Selected publications 

 1994 150 Jahre Salzburger Kunstverein
 1995 Lois Renner
 1998 Florian Pumhösl
 2005 Michael Raedecker
 2005 Trichtlinburg
 2007 Archiv Peter Piller. Zeitung
 2008 Otto Zitko. Die Konstruktion der Geste
 2011 Roman Ondák
 2014 Punctum
 2015 Stan Douglas
 2016 The People's Cinema
 2017 A Painter's Doubt
 2020 Gernot Wieland
 2021 ... Line as Thought, Lines as Universes ...

Literature 
 Gottfried Goiginger: Toleranz als Programm. Der Salzburger Kunstverein nach 1945. In: 150 Jahre Salzburger Kunstverein (Ed.), Kunst und Öffentlichkeit 1844–1994. Salzburg 1994, p. 171–199.
 Roman Höllbacher: Das Künstlerhaus als Denkmal des Kunstvereins. In: 150 Jahre Salzburger Kunstverein (Ed.), Kunst und Öffentlichkeit 1844–1994. Salzburg 1994, p. 47–77.
 Christa Svoboda: Zur Geschichte des Salzburger Kunstvereins. In: 150 Jahre Salzburger Kunstverein (Ed.), Kunst und Öffentlichkeit 1844–1994. Salzburg 1994, p. 9–46.

References

External links 
 

Organisations based in Salzburg
Culture in Salzburg